Events from the year 1562 in France

Incumbents
 Monarch – Charles IX

Events
January – Edict of Saint-Germain
1 March – Massacre of Vassy
22 September – Treaty of Hampton Court
28 September to 26 October – Siege of Rouen
19 December – Battle of Dreux

Births
 
19 August – Charles II de Bourbon-Vendôme, Cardinal (died 1594)
10 December – Roger de Saint-Lary de Termes, duke (died 1646)

Full date missing
Charles de Gontaut, duc de Biron, soldier (died 1602)

Deaths
13 October – Claudin de Sermisy, composer (born c.1490)
31 October – Augustin Marlorat. Protestant reformer (born 1506)
19 December – Jacques Dalbon, Seigneur de Saint Andre, soldier (born c.1505)

Full date missing
Omer Talon, humanist (born c.1510)

See also

References

1560s in France